Qeshlaq-e Baqersoli Ali Sahami (also Romanized as Qeshlāq-e Bāqersolī ʿAlī Sahāmī; also known as Allah Verdī (Persian: الله وردي)) is a village in Qeshlaq-e Sharqi Rural District, Qeshlaq Dasht District, Bileh Savar County, Ardabil Province, Iran. At the 2006 census, its population was 27, in 6 families.

References 

Towns and villages in Bileh Savar County